UOW Malaysia KDU University College (Formerly known as KDU University College) is a private university college in Malaysia, with its flagship campus in Utropolis Glenmarie, Shah Alam.  Established in 1983, and a pioneer in Malaysian private education, UOW Malaysia KDU was one of the first private colleges in Malaysia to have its own purpose-built campus. KDU offers education programmes at the Certificate, Diploma, Degree and Masters levels.

UOW Malaysia KDU University College is part of Paramount Education, a fully integrated education services provider for primary, secondary, tertiary, and postgraduate level studies as well as executive and professional development programmes, which also includes KDU College (Damansara Jaya Campus), KDU Penang University College, KDU Management Development Centre and KDU Smart Schools (private national and international schools for primary and secondary school students)

History

Established in 1983, and a pioneer in Malaysian private education, KDU was one of the first private colleges in Malaysia to have its own purpose-built campus in Damansara Jaya. Kolej Damansara Utama (as it was first known) opened for enrolment, offering programmes such as the GCE A-Level and the American Credit Transfer programme, and welcomed its first batch of students. In 1984, KDU introduced the first overseas twinning programme in partnership with Middlesex Polytechnic (Middlesex University), offering young Malaysians an opportunity to pursue internationally renowned programmes at a more affordable cost.

In 1991, a second branch (KDU Penang University College) was established in Penang to cater to the higher education needs of aspiring youths in the northern region.

In November 2010, KDU College was upgraded to University College status by the Ministry of Higher Education, Malaysia, and began offering specialised homegrown degree programmes. The ceremony was officiated by the Minister of Higher Education, Datuk Seri Mohamed Khaled Nordin.

The Damansara Jaya campus is now home to KDU College, offering pre-university, foundation and degree programmes from international collaborations and university partners. In line with its expansion, KDU University College moved to its all-new campus flagship campus in early 2015. The new Utropolis Glenmarie campus is designed to inspire and provide hands-on learning for real world experiences, and is part of a live-and learn, work-and-play self-contained university metropolis.

In 2016, KDU Penang University College had a groundbreaking ceremony to unveil construction plans for a 10-acre campus in Batu Kawan, Penang. The ceremony was officiated by then Chief Minister of Penang YAB Lim Guan Eng and was accompanied by representatives from Penang Development Corporations (PDC).

Datuk Teo Chiang Quan, the Paramount Corporation Berhad Group chairman and executive director mentioned the first phase on a 4ha site would be completed in the year 2018.

The Batu Kawan campus is modeled after the "utropolis" in Glenmarie, Shah Alam, Selangor.

Academic structure
UOW Malaysia KDU employs only qualified academic staff that meets the requirement of both its partner institutions as well as the Malaysian Qualification Agency's requirement, with PhD and master's degree holders teaching in degree programmes and a minimum of a degree to teach in the certificate and diploma programmes. 

UOW Malaysia KDU University College:
 School of Business
 Accounting & Finance, Business, Banking & Finance
 School of Communication & Creative Arts
 Communication, Creative Arts, Entertainment Arts, Entrepreneurial Design
 School of Computing & Creative Media
 Computing, Creative Media, Game Development, Computer Science, Software Engineering, Information Systems
 School of Engineering
 Electrical & Electronics Engineering, Mechanical Engineering
 School of Hospitality, Tourism & Culinary Arts
 Hospitality & Tourism, Culinary Arts

UOW Malaysia KDU College:
 School of Pre-University Studies
 Cambridge GCE A Levels, Foundation Studies
 KDU Law School
 Law
 School of Business & Social Sciences
 Business
 American Degree Program Center
 American Degree Transfer Program
 Professional Accountancy Center
 ACCA & CAT

References

External links

 UOW Malaysia KDU Official Website

Private universities and colleges in Malaysia
Colleges in Malaysia
Law schools in Malaysia
Educational institutions established in 1983
Universities and colleges in Selangor
Business schools in Malaysia
Murdoch University
Engineering universities and colleges in Malaysia
Hospitality schools in Malaysia
Information technology schools in Malaysia
1983 establishments in Malaysia
Design schools in Malaysia
Cambridge schools in Malaysia